Acropora tenella is a species of acroporid coral found in the central Indo-Pacific, southeast Asia, Japan, the East China Sea and the oceanic western Pacific Ocean.

Taxonomy
It was described by Brook in 1892 as Madrepora tenella. It is also known under its synonym of Acropora eibli, which it was described under by Pillai and Scheer in 1976.

Description
It occurs in colonies with plate-like structures arranged horizontally. Its branches are flattened and often diverge; they often contain broad central ridges. Its axial corallites are distinct; it has radial corallites that are distinct and are laterally present on some older branches but are generally placed irregularly over the branches. The coral is cream in colour and its branches have either blue or white ends.

Distribution
It is classified as a vulnerable species on the IUCN Red List and it is believed that its population is decreasing in line with the global decline of coral reefs; the species is also listed under Appendix II of CITES. Figures of the population of A. tenella are unknown, but is likely to be threatened by the global reduction of coral reefs, the increase of temperature causing coral bleaching, climate change, human activity, the crown-of-thorns starfish and disease. It occurs in the central Indo-Pacific, southeast Asia, Japan, the East China Sea and the oceanic western Pacific Ocean.

References

Acropora
Cnidarians of the Indian Ocean
Cnidarians of the Pacific Ocean
Fauna of Oceania
Fauna of East Asia
Marine fauna of Asia
Vulnerable animals
Vulnerable fauna of Asia
Vulnerable fauna of Oceania
Corals described in 1892